Fayville is an unincorporated community in Alexander County, Illinois, United States. Fayville is located along the Mississippi River south of Thebes.

References

Unincorporated communities in Alexander County, Illinois
Unincorporated communities in Illinois
Cape Girardeau–Jackson metropolitan area